Shadowgate is a black-and-white point-and-click adventure game published for the Macintosh as part of the MacVenture series. The game is named for its setting, Castle Shadowgate, residence of the evil Warlock Lord. The player, as the "last of a great line of hero-kings" is charged with the task of saving the world by defeating the Warlock Lord, who is attempting to summon up the demon Behemoth out of Hell. Later that year, a color version of the game was released for the Amiga and Atari ST, and in 1989 for the Nintendo Entertainment System.

Gameplay

The player must solve a series of puzzles throughout the castle to proceed to the Warlock Lord's chamber. Due to the castle's perilous nature, at least one lit torch must be in the player's possession at all times. If the torch is extinguished, the player soon stumbles, breaking his neck, and must then continue from a saved game (or the area in which they died, in game console versions). Only a finite number of torches are to be found throughout the game, which effectively acts as a time limit to proceedings. Various items that can be acquired include a sword, a sling and other ancient weapons; though these weapons can not actually be used as striking weapons, they can be clicked on at the appropriate time to deliver a fatal blow to specific enemies.

The game has many opportunities for death, including being burned by a dragon's breath, attacked by a cyclops, sucked into outer space through a broken mirror, dissolved by acidic slime, mauled by a wolf-woman, eaten by sharks, and suicide. Virtually any action taken by the player which is not the correct solution to a puzzle will result in a fatality. These deaths were often graphically described in the game's text (along with often sardonic and humorous comments), even in the NES version (in spite of Nintendo's policy of censorship at the time). Many of the game's puzzles rely on a system of trial and error, the problem of which is overcome by the ability to save the game state (as in most adventure games). Subtle hints can be found in books and the descriptive game texts. In the NES version, these are replaced by an outright hint feature which gives vague clues about what is noteworthy in any given room in the castle. The further the player progresses, however, the more useless this feature becomes, deteriorating into nothing but encouraging messages by the game's end. The NES version of Shadowgate is the few NES games with a Swedish language version.

Plot

At the very beginning of Shadowgate, the only information the game provides to the player is:

It is then up to the player to gather more information about the world through examining objects and reading any scrolls or books they come across.  While reading some of the in-game books and scrolls is necessary to finish the game, others only provide exposition about the world Shadowgate takes place in. Reading the book Before Shadowgate, the comic book Shadowgate Saga: Raven, and playing the sequels Beyond Shadowgate and Shadowgate 64: Trials of the Four Towers reveals more details.

Shadowgate takes place in the fictional world of "Tarkus" ("Tyragon" in the Before Shadowgate novel, also known as "Terrakk”, the Kal Torlinese term for "Earth") where creatures from fantasy and myth live. In the land of "Kal Zathyn" (according to the novel), on top of "Gatekeeper Mountain", is the living castle of "Shadowgate" where a group of powerful wizards known as the "Circle of Twelve" once met. One of the Circle of Twelve, "Talimar", became corrupt and was removed from the Circle. After that, he began to call himself "The Warlock Lord" and caused chaos across the lands by inciting conflict between humans, elves, dwarves, and the races on Tyragon. After those wars ended and the land began to rebuild, the Warlock Lord amassed an army of followers, including trolls, orcs, goblins, and other creatures. He waged war against the Kings of the Lands, and was defeated when the rest of the Circle of Twelve intervened. They sealed the Warlock Lord inside the caverns underneath Shadowgate, and then disbanded. The only wizard who remained was "Lakmir", who took on the role of Tyragon's guardian to ensure that the Warlock Lord's evil would not threaten the Lands again.

Years later, the Warlock Lord escaped from his confinement, and planned to raise the mightiest of titans, the Behemoth, from the depths of darkness to serve him. With the Behemoth, the Warlock Lord would escape Castle Shadowgate, and terrorize the planet once more. To keep this from happening, Lakhmir sought out the last of the "Line of Kings", also known as "The Seed of Prophecy", who was foretold to stop the Warlock Lord and the Behemoth. Doing so would require the "Staff of Ages", a powerful artifact with enough power to slay the Behemoth that was hidden within Shadowgate.  After finding this hero, Lakhmir sends him to the entrance of Shadowgate to begin his quest.

It is up to the player to take on the role of "The Seed of Prophecy", enter Castle Shadowgate, solve its puzzles, survive its many traps, and stop the Warlock Lord once and for all. If they survive to the end, they will come across the Warlock Lord just as he succeeds in opening the gates of Hell and summoning the Behemoth. If the player was successful in finding and assembling the holy artifact called the Staff of Ages by this point, then they would be able to mortally wound the demon with it. As it dies, the Behemoth then drags the Warlock Lord with him into Hell. The player returns victorious, where he is betrothed to the King's daughter and entitled High Lord of the Westland.

Ports
The game was ported to other computers including a color version of the game for the Atari ST and Amiga later in 1987. In 1988 it was released for MS-DOS and in 1989 for the Apple IIGS. It made its first console appearance later that year on the Nintendo Entertainment System. The success of Shadowgate on the NES prompted ICOM Simulations to have Kemco/Seika port the other MacVenture titles to the console, including Déjà Vu and Uninvited.

In 1992, an enhanced version of the game was released for Windows 3.1x.

Reception

Computer Gaming World gave the game a very positive review, noting the game uses the same superior interface as prior MacVenture games. The difficulty was noted as a step up from Deja Vu and Uninvited, but Shadowgate was also said to be more flexible, allowing more than one solution to some puzzles.

The game was reviewed in 1987 in Dragon #128 by Hartley, Patricia, and Kirk Lesser in "The Role of Computers" column. The reviewers stated that "Shadowgate is a great adventure game in that you must continually be aware of what’s already been accomplished to complete subsequent puzzles". The reviewers gave the game 5/5 stars.

Macworld reviewed the Macintosh version of Shadowgate, praising its extensive gameplay, stating that "so much is jammed into these two disks that nearly everyone should find this game appealing ... ShadowGate plays easily and instinctively". Macworld also praises Shadowgate's graphics and sound, calling the graphics "expertly crafted", but express that they "[tend] to lack originality", and call the sound effects "far better than those of most adventure games". Macworld calls Shadowgate "technically, visually, and aurally superior to most of its competition" but criticizes the game's mood, stating that it doesn't "take itself seriously enough to create a mood of mystery", and also lacks the 'tongue-in-cheek' humor of other adventure games, creating a feeling of something "lacking".

Legacy
In 1996, Infinite Ventures acquired from Viacom, the rights to Shadowgate and other games originally developed by ICOM Simulations. ICOM Simulations had been acquired by Viacom in 1994 but had published no updates to the original products. After the acquisition, Infinite Ventures ported the game to other operating systems (Windows '95/'98/2000/Me) and portable systems (Windows CE P/PC, Palm OS, and Pocket PC) under the name of Shadowgate Classic. These versions had a new interface and menu layout, with artwork based on the 1996 Windows versions.

In 1999, Infinite Ventures licensed the NES version of Shadowgate to KEMCO and it was ported to the Game Boy Color with enhanced sprites and animations also under the name of Shadowgate Classic.

In 2005, a mobile phone version of the game was released by Vindigo Entertainment. Once again using the name of Shadowgate Classic, this version featured brand new graphics, puzzles, challenges, and areas.

In 2006, Infinite Ventures licensed the rights to the ICOM simulations portfolio to Zojoi, a company formed by Shadowgate's original game designers, Dave Marsh and Karl Roelofs. In October 2012, Zojoi, LLC launched a Kickstarter campaign to secure funding for a remake of Shadowgate.  Original game creators Dave Marsh and Karl Roelofs appeared in the pitch video and showed pre-production footage of the game in development. They set a crowd-funding goal of $120,000. In the 2nd update of the Kickstarter campaign, the Black Axe, an item and quest that had been cut from the original game due to size constraints, was announced to be reintroduced in the new version of Shadowgate. Those who pledged $2,500 or more received a replica Staff of Ages. The campaign finished successfully, earning $137,232 in pledges by November 25 and reaching its first stretch goal. The remake was completed and released for the PCs in 2014. In 2019, it was ported to the PlayStation 4, Xbox One and Nintendo Switch.

Sequels

In 1991, a novel written under the pen name "F.X. Nine" called Before Shadowgate, was published by Scholastic Corporation as part of the Worlds of Power series of video game novelizations of third party Nintendo Entertainment System games. The novel acts as a prequel to the game, and featured contributions from Shadowgate co-creators Dave Marsh and Karl Roelofs, who provided important details and information to the book's author.

There have been two sequels to the game. The first, Beyond Shadowgate, was released for the TurboGrafx-16 in 1993 and the second, Shadowgate 64: Trials of the Four Towers, for the Nintendo 64 in 1999. Another N64 sequel, Shadowgate Rising, was well into development, but the project was scrapped when Nintendo announced the console which would become the GameCube.

On September 16, 2021, 317 Games launched a Kickstarter crowdfunding campaign for Shadowgate, The Living Castle, a board game based on the Shadowgate series.

In October 2021, Zojoi and Azure Drop Studios released Shadowgate VR: The Mines of Mythrok, an exclusive Oculus Quest title.

On January 22, 2023, Zojoi announced a Kickstarter crowdfunding campaign for Beyond Shadowgate, the official sequel to the NES version of Shadowgate. A video from series co-creator Dave Marsh notes this project uses the original design documents from 1990 and is unrelated to the TurboGrafx-16 game.

References

External links

Shadowgate at Interactive Fiction Database

 
1987 video games
Adventure games
Amiga games
Apple IIGS games
Atari ST games
CD-i games
DOS games
First-person adventure games
Game Boy Color games
Horror video games
ICOM Simulations games
Classic Mac OS games
Mobile games
Nintendo Entertainment System games
Video games developed in the United States
Windows games
Windows Mobile Professional games
Dark fantasy video games
Video games about witchcraft
Video games set in castles
Virtual Console games
Palm OS games
Single-player video games
PlayStation 4 games
Xbox One games
Nintendo Switch games
Mindscape games